The Further Adventures of Uncle Sam is a 1970 animated short film by Dale Case and Robert Mitchell.

Plot
Uncle Sam and his friend the American Eagle live peacefully in the American southwest, running a gas station. But when Sam is kidnapped by men with money bags for heads, the Eagle goes off to rescue him. When Sam is rescued, he tells the Eagle that there is a plot to capture the Statue of Liberty by a bomb-headed businessman.

Accolades
The Further Adventures of Uncle Sam was nominated for an Academy Award for Best Animated Short Film.

The film won the Grand Prix at the 1971 Annecy International Animation Festival, in a tie with Poland's The Appeal and Czechoslovakia's The Bride.

It was preserved by the Academy Film Archive in 2007.

See also 
1970 in film
Independent animation
Counterculture of the 1960s

References

External links
 
 
 
 The Further Adventures of Uncle Sam on Cartoon Brew

1970 films
1970 animated films
Animated films about birds
Statue of Liberty
American animated short films
Animated films about animals
1970s rediscovered films
Rediscovered American films
1970s American films